"Ça n'finira jamais" is a 2008 song recorded by French artist Johnny Hallyday. It was the first single from his album of the same name on which it features as first track. Written by Patrice Guirao, who has previously worked for many notable artists (Emmanuel Moire, Chimène Badi, Florent Pagny, Magalie Vaé...), and composed by French pop singers Calogero and his brother Gioacchino, a former member of Les Charts, "Ça n'finira jamais" was released in mid-November 2008 and the B-side of the single is a new song, "Croire en l'homme", written by Kevin Roentgen from the band Orson, Oliver Leiber, and Pierre Yves Lebert, which is also included on the special edition album cd. The single went straight to number-one on the French SNEP Singles Chart, selling 13,893 units that week, thus becoming Hallyday's fifth and final number-one hit throughout his 48-year career.

Track listings
 CD single
 "Ça n'finira jamais"
 "Croire en l'homme"

 CD single - Collector edition
 "Ça n'finira jamais"
 "Croire en l'homme"
 "Ça n'finira jamais" (video)

Charts

References

2008 singles
Johnny Hallyday songs
SNEP Top Singles number-one singles
Songs with music by Pascal Obispo
Songs with music by Calogero (singer)
2008 songs
Warner Music France singles
Songs with lyrics by Patrice Guirao